In March 1907 the Russian astronomer Nikolai Alexandrovich Morozov published the book Revelation In Thunderstorm And Tempest. History of the Apocalypses Origin. (German title Die Offenbarung Johannis – Eine astronomisch-historische Untersuchung, meaning in ). After intervention by the Orthodox clergy, the book was added to the index of prohibited books the next year. In his book Morozov makes the case that the Book of Revelation is describing the astronomical constellation over the island of Patmos on Sunday, September 30, 395 (Julian date). Morozov presumes that the educated John was able to calculate the Saros cycle and, therefore, did observe the sky on this day in attendance of a solar eclipse. (This eclipse did occur indeed—- over South America, however.)

Morozov's claims
1. The weekday of the event is named explicitly: 
Rev. 1,10: "I was in the Spirit on the Lords Day" (believed to be Sunday).
   
2. The description of the skies starts systematically at the Pole with a constellation named Throne (presently Ursa Minor): 
Rev. 4,2: And a throne was set in heaven...
   
3. The text continues mentioning the Milky Way and the signs of the zodiac denoting the four seasons: Lion, Taurus, Sagittarius and Eagle (presently Aquarius): 
Rev. 4,6-7: And before the throne there was a sea of glass like unto crystal: and in the midst of the throne, and round about the throne, were four beasts full of eyes before and behind. And the first beast was like a lion, and the second beast like a calf, and the third beast had a face as a man, and the fourth beast was like a flying eagle.
 
4. The four horses were interpreted by Morozov as traditional metaphors for the planets Jupiter, Mars, Mercury and Saturn. The constellations Sagittarius, Perseus, Libra and Scorpion were sitting on them: 
Rev. 6,2: And I saw, and behold a white horse: and he that sat on him had a bow;
Rev. 6,4: And there went out another horse that was red: and power was given to him that sat thereon to take peace from the earth, and that they should kill one another: and there was given unto him a great sword.
Rev. 6,5: And I beheld, and lo a black horse; and he that sat on him had a pair of balances in his hand.
Rev. 6,8: And I looked, and behold a pale horse: and his name that sat on him was Death, and Hell followed with him.
 
5. Sun and Moon were named explicitly.  The only female character of the zodiac is Virgo: 
Rev. 12,1: A woman clothed with the sun, and the moon under her feet, and upon her head a crown of twelve stars.
 
6. The planet Venus , used as a symbol of female eroticism and harlotry, united with the red star Antares (Anti-Mars) within the constellation Scorpion:
Rev. 17,3-4: and I saw a woman sit upon a scarlet colored beast, full of names of blasphemy, having seven heads and ten horns. And the woman was arrayed in purple and scarlet color, and decked with gold and precious stones and pearls, having a golden cup in her hand full of abominations and filthiness of her fornication.
 
The description within the Book of Revelation matches exactly the Constellation for the Julian date 30-9-395.

Right ascension and Declination for the island of Patmos at 15:00 UTC on this day were calculated using the program Yoursky. (Due to precession R.A. of the stars has been shifted since 395).

Sun, Moon and the 3 outer and 2 inner planets will produce 3.732.480 combinations within the 12 signs of the zodiac (125 × 5 × 3).
Therefore, an accidental match is quite unlikely.  
 
At this point criticism of Chronology begins: Common understanding says, referring to Irenaeus (Haer. V,30,3), that the Revelation to John was written near the end of the reign of the Roman emperor Domitian (81-96). Consequently, either the Revelation has been dated some three centuries too old, or the reign of Domitian has. Unless of course real prophecy was occurring and the constellations of 30th Sept 395 were predicted in it. Such confirmation by astronomy may have contributed to its acceptance as canonical.

Literature
 Nikolai A. Morozov: "The Revelation to John - An astronomic historical Investigation" (Die Offenbarung Johannis – Eine astronomisch-historische Untersuchung, 223 pages, Stuttgart 1912.)
 Nikolai A. Morozov: "Revelation within Thunderstorm and Tempest. History of the Apocalypses Origin." (Откровение в грозе и буре. История возникновения Апокалипсиса. СПб.: Былое, 1907.)

References

Notes
This article is a translation from the German Wikipedia.

1905 non-fiction books
Ancient astronomy
Astronomy books
Astrological texts
Book of Revelation